Yakshur-Bodya (Jakšur-Böďja) is a rural locality (a selo) and the administrative center of Yakshur-Bodyinsky District, Udmurtia, Russia. Population:

References

Notes

Sources

Rural localities in Udmurtia